Embonas, sometimes transliterated Emponas, is a Greek mountain village, seat of the municipal unit of Attavyros, on the island of Rhodes, South Aegean region. In 2011 its population was 1,242; 1,061 in the village proper and 181 in the locality of Mandriko (Μανδρικό).

Overview
It is located halfway up the Attavyros, a gray rocky mountain of 1,215 m height. On the top is a temple of Zeus. The village is the centre of wine industry on Rhodes and attracts many tourist daytrips.

References

External links

 Pictures of Mount Attavyros

Populated places in Rhodes